Jaffeite is a hydrated calcium silicate with the following chemical formula:

Occurrence
The mineral was first found at the Kombat Mine in Namibia. In 1989 the mineral was named after Prof. Howard W. Jaffe (1919–2002) of the University of Massachusetts Amherst.

References
 webmineral.com - Jaffeite
 minsocam.org - Jaffeite
 Mindat.org - Jaffeite
 Handbook of Mineralogy - Jaffeite

Sorosilicates
Trigonal minerals
Minerals in space group 147